East Coventry Township is a township in Chester County, Pennsylvania, United States. The population was 7,068 at the 2020 census.

History
The township derives its name from Coventry, England, the native home of an early settler.

Fricks Locks Historic District, and River Bend Farm are listed on the National Register of Historic Places.

Geography
The township includes the unincorporated community of Parker Ford.

Adjacent townships
Lower Pottsgrove Township, Montgomery County (north)
Limerick Township, Montgomery County (east)
East Vincent Township, Chester County (south)
South Coventry Township, Chester County (southwest)
North Coventry Township, Chester County (west)

Demographics

At the 2010 census, the township was 92.5% non-Hispanic White, 3.1% Black or African American, 0.1% Native American, 1.4% Asian, and 1.4% were two or more races. 1.7% of the population were of Hispanic or Latino ancestry.

As of the census of 2000, there were 4,566 people, 1,649 households, and 1,246 families residing in the township.  The population density was 423.4 people per square mile (163.5/km).  There were 1,684 housing units at an average density of 156.2/sq mi (60.3/km).  The racial makeup of the township was 98.38% White, 0.85% African American, 0.11% Native American, 0.22% Asian, 0.18% from other races, and 0.26% from two or more races. Hispanic or Latino of any race were 0.70% of the population.

There were 1,649 households, out of which 32.7% had children under the age of 18 living with them, 66.5% were married couples living together, 6.8% had a female householder with no husband present, and 24.4% were non-families. 20.4% of all households were made up of individuals, and 9.2% had someone living alone who was 65 years of age or older.  The average household size was 2.64 and the average family size was 3.05.

In the township the population was spread out, with 23.4% under the age of 18, 5.2% from 18 to 24, 25.8% from 25 to 44, 27.3% from 45 to 64, and 18.2% who were 65 years of age or older.  The median age was 43 years. For every 100 females, there were 91.0 males.  For every 100 females age 18 and over, there were 86.2 males.

Education
It is in the Owen J. Roberts School District. Owen J. Roberts High School is the zoned comprehensive high school.

Transportation

Pennsylvania Route 23 and Pennsylvania Route 724 are the numbered highways serving East Coventry Township. PA 23 follows Ridge Road on a northwest-southeast alignment through the southern portion of the township, while PA 724 follows Schuylkill Road along a northwest-southeast alignment through northern and eastern portions of the township.

Notable people
Grover C. Talbot, Pennsylvania State Representative for Delaware County (1925-1934), 116th Speaker of the Pennsylvania House of Representatives (1933-1934)

Points of interest
 Fricks Locks Historic District, an 18th-century village along the Schuylkill Canal

See also
 Parker Ford, Pennsylvania

References

External links

East Coventry Township

Townships in Chester County, Pennsylvania
Townships in Pennsylvania